Percy Doyle Reserve is a sporting facility in Duncraig, Western Australia currently used for association football. The ground is used by Sorrento FC in the National Premier Leagues Western Australia, and it has previously been used by Perth Glory Women in the W-League and Perth Glory FC Youth in the National Youth League. The stadium is surrounded by a series of football pitches used by various teams competing in Football West competitions.

References

External links
Official Website of Sorrento FC

Soccer venues in Perth, Western Australia